Barbodes flavifuscus, known locally as the katapa-tapa, was a species of cyprinid fish endemic to Lake Lanao in Mindanao, the Philippines.  This species reached a length of  SL. It is now considered extinct.

Sources 

Barbodes
Freshwater fish of the Philippines
Endemic fauna of the Philippines
Fauna of Mindanao
Fish described in 1924
Taxonomy articles created by Polbot